Rockaway Inlet is a strait connecting Jamaica Bay, wholly within New York City, with the Atlantic Ocean. It separates the Rockaway Peninsula in Queens from the Floyd Bennett Field (formerly Barren Island) in Brooklyn.

Rockaway Inlet is bounded by Brooklyn to the north and Rockaway Peninsula to the south. It is the entrance to Jamaica Bay, and most of the inlet is within the boundary of Gateway National Recreation Area. Its entrance is marked by a light on a jetty extending southward from Rockaway Point. The entrance channel extends westward of the jetty and is marked by lighted buoys. It has a depth of about 15 feet midchannel with a shoal of only one foot. In 1968 a light failed and the tanker Mary A. Whalen ran aground, resulting in a case entitled United States v. Reliable Transfer Co. about dividing damage payments.

The inlet is spanned by the Marine Parkway–Gil Hodges Memorial Bridge.

See also 
East Rockaway Inlet, separating the peninsula from Atlantic Beach

References

External links 
Nautical chart

Straits of Kings County, New York
Straits of Queens County, New York
Inlets of New York (state)